Defreinarctia is a genus of tiger moths in the family Erebidae. The genus was erected by Vladimir Viktorovitch Dubatolov and Yasunori Kishida in 2005. The moths in the genus are found in southeast Asia.

Species 
 Defreinarctia armini (de Freina, 1999)
 Defreinarctia dianxi (Fang et Cao, 1984)

References

Spilosomina
Moth genera